The Mayor of Woking are listed below.

Chairmen of Woking Urban District Council

Mayors of Woking Borough Council
Source: Woking Council

References
Woking Borough – former mayors

Woking
Woking
Surrey-related lists
 Woking